AWB is the second studio album by the Scottish funk and soul band Average White Band, released in August 1974.

AWB topped Billboard's Pop Albums and Black Albums charts.  Its million-selling single "Pick Up the Pieces" knocked Linda Ronstadt's "You're No Good" out of #1 on Billboard's Hot 100.

A 2004 expanded re-issue from Sony/Columbia in the UK includes a bonus CD with several demo session recordings made before the group joined Atlantic Records – taken from the so-called "Clover Sessions," recorded at Clover Studios, Los Angeles, CA, in 1973. This album was eventually released as "How Sweet Can You Get?"

Track listing 
Side one
 "You Got It" (Roger Ball, Hamish Stuart, Alan Gorrie) – 3:38
 "Got the Love" (Stuart, Ball, Robbie McIntosh) – 3:52
 "Pick Up the Pieces" (Average White Band) – 3:58
 "Person to Person" (Average White Band) – 3:38
 "Work to Do" (O'Kelly Isley, Ronald Isley, Rudolph Isley) – 4:21

Side two
 "Nothing You Can Do" (Gorrie, Stuart, Ball) – 4:06
 "Just Wanna Love You Tonight" (Ball, Gorrie) – 3:57
 "Keepin' It to Myself" (Gorrie) – 3:52
 "I Just Can't Give You Up" (Stuart) – 3:24
 "There's Always Someone Waiting" (Gorrie) – 5:38

All songs arranged by Average White Band. All horn parts arranged by Roger Ball.

Bonus track on 1995 Rhino re-issue (Rhino 71588)
11. "Pick Up the Pieces" – 21:40 (from The Atlantic Family Live at Montreux)

Expanded 2CD re-issue (2004) 
Disc one
Original release

Disc two - The Clover Sessions / How Sweet Can You Get?
 "Person to Person"
 "Keepin' It To Myself"
 "There's Always Someone Waiting"
 "McEwan's Export"
 "Got the Love"
 "Work to Do"
 "Just Want to Love You Tonight"
 "Pick Up the Pieces"
 "I Just Can't Give You Up"
 "How Sweet Can You Get (Mark 1)"

Bonus tracks on 2005 Columbia-Europe re-issue (Columbia 520204)
11. "How Sweet Can You Get (Mark 1)"
12. "McEwan's Export"

Personnel

Average White Band 
 Alan Gorrie – lead vocals (on "Keepin' It To Myself" and "There's Always Someone Waiting"), co-lead vocals (on "You Got It", "Work To Do", "Nothing You Can Do", and "Just Wanna Love You Tonight"), background vocals, bass, guitar (on "You Got It")
 Hamish Stuart – lead vocals (on "Got The Love", "Person To Person", and "I Just Can't Give You Up"), co-lead vocals (on "You Got It", "Work To Do", "Nothing You Can Do", and "Just Wanna Love You Tonight"), background vocals, lead guitar, bass (on "You Got It")
 Roger Ball – keyboards, alto & baritone saxophones
 Molly Duncan – tenor saxophone
 Onnie McIntyre – background vocals, guitar, guitar solo on "Work To Do"
 Robbie McIntosh – drums, percussion

Additional musicians 
 Ralph MacDonald – congas, percussion
 Michael Brecker – tenor saxophone
 Randy Brecker – trumpet
 Marvin Stamm – trumpet
 Mel Davis – trumpet
 Glenn Ferris – trombone
 Ken Bichel – mellotron (on "Just Wanna Love You Tonight")

Other musicians 
(Live at Montreux bonus track)
 Sonny Fortune – alto saxophone
 Jaroslav Jakubovič – baritone saxophone
 David "Fathead" Newman – alto saxophone
 Dick Morrissey – tenor saxophone
 Herbie Mann – flute
 Don Ellis – trumpet
 Lew Soloff – trumpet
 Gil Rathel – trumpet
 Barry Rogers – trombone
 Alan Kaplan – trombone
 Jim Mullen – guitar
 Richard Tee – electric piano
 Raphael Cruz – percussion
 Sammy Figueroa – percussion

Production
 Gene Paul – mixing, engineering (NYC) 
 Lewis Hahn – engineering (NYC)
 Karl Richardson – engineering (Miami)
 Steve Klein – engineering (Miami)
 Ron Albert – engineering (Miami)
 Howard Albert – engineering (Miami)
 Jimmy Douglass – engineering (additional recording)
 Bobby Warner – engineering (additional recording)
 Dennis King – mastering engineer
 Arif Mardin – production, mixing
 Alan Pariser – direction
 Alan Gorrie – logo concept
 Tim Bruckner – front cover drawing
 Barry Feinstein – design & photography

Other Album Notes
"AWB would like to express their deep appreciation to Jerry Wexler, Alan Pariser and Bruce McCaskill."

Chart positions 
Billboard Music Charts (United States)

Album

Singles

See also
List of number-one albums of 1975 (U.S.)
List of number-one R&B albums of 1975 (U.S.)

References 

 Atlantic SD 7308
 Average White Band at [ Allmusic.com]

Average White Band albums
1974 albums
Albums produced by Arif Mardin
Atlantic Records albums